The 2020 Mississippi flag referendum was a legislatively referred state statute appearing on the November 3, 2020 general election ballot in Mississippi.

Voters were asked whether the design proposed by the Commission to Redesign the Mississippi State Flag, which does not contain the Confederate battle flag and includes the words "In God We Trust", should be adopted as the new official flag of Mississippi. The referendum passed by a 72.98% to 27.02% margin on November 3, 2020. Voters were not given the option to retain the old, Confederate-based flag.

Background 

After an earlier redesign proposal had been voted down in the 2001 Mississippi flag referendum and following the adoption of a new state flag by Georgia in 2003, the Mississippi flag remained the only U.S. state flag to include the Confederate battle flag's saltire. In 2001, a survey conducted by the North American Vexillological Association (NAVA) placed Mississippi's flag 22nd in design quality of the 72 Canadian provincial, U.S. state and U.S. territorial flags ranked.

On June 9, 2020 lawmakers gathered votes and started drafting legislation to change the state flag. The action came after weeks of national protests following the murder of George Floyd, including a protest outside the Mississippi Governor's Mansion on June 6. This was the first substantial action to change the state flag since the 2001 referendum. On June 11, Senate Democrats filed a resolution to change the state flag. On June 24, Lieutenant Governor Delbert Hosemann announced his support for a new flag. Hosemann was joined by Attorney General Lynn Fitch, State Auditor Shad White, Agriculture Commissioner Andy Gipson and Insurance Commissioner Mike Chaney.

On June 28, 2020, the Mississippi Legislature passed a bill, House Bill 1796, that would relinquish the state flag, remove the state flag from public buildings within 15 days of the bill's effective date and constitute a nine-member commission to design a new flag that would be put to voters in a referendum to be held in November 2020. The bill required that the Confederate battle flag not be included on the proposed design and the motto "In God We Trust" be included, as Georgia did when it removed the Confederate emblem from its state flag in 2003. In the House, the bill was passed by 91 in favor and 23 against. In the Senate, the bill was passed with 37 in favor and 14 against.

Reversing his earlier claimed position that the people, and not "a backroom deal by a bunch of politicians", should make the decision to change the flag, Governor Tate Reeves signed the flag bill into law on June 30, 2020. As the legislation repealed the sections of the Mississippi State Code which made provisions for a state flag, namely Section 3-3-16, Mississippi ceased to have an official state flag at this point.

Proposed design

Commission to Redesign the Mississippi State Flag 
Under the terms of House Bill 1796, a body known as the Commission to Redesign the Mississippi State Flag was constituted to suggest a design for a new state flag no later than September 14, 2020. The bill instructed the Mississippi Department of Archives and History to develop a plan for the removal of the 1894 flag from public buildings across the state and provide administrative support for the commission. The act stipulated that any design proposed by the commission must include the words "In God We Trust" and must not contain the Confederate battle flag. The commission consisted of nine members, three of which were appointed by the Speaker of the Mississippi House of Representatives, three members appointed by the Lieutenant Governor of Mississippi, and three by the Governor. Former state Supreme Court Justice Reuben V. Anderson, who serves as president of the Board of Trustees of the Mississippi Department of Archives and History, was unanimously elected as the commission's chairman at its first meeting on July 22.

The proposed design would be subject to a referendum to be held concurrently with the general election on November 3, 2020. Should the referendum result in a "yes" vote for the proposed design, then the design would be officially adopted as the new state flag of Mississippi during the next regular legislative session. Should the referendum result in a "no" vote for the proposed design, the commission would reconvene and propose different designs. The legislation stated that further referendums could then be held on the Tuesday after the first Monday in November of a year in which the commission makes a new recommendation until a "yes" vote is achieved. Mississippi would remain without an official state flag until a new one is adopted through this process. Voters were not given the option to retain the previous, Confederate-based flag.

Call for public submissions 
The Mississippi Department of Archives and History invited the public to submit designs for a new state flag on July 13. In accordance with the rules imposed by House Bill 1796, designs would only be accepted if they contained the words "In God We Trust" and not include the Confederate battle flag. The commission also added that suggestions would need to be unique and adhere to principles of the North American Vexillological Association: that the design should use only two or three basic colors, be simple enough for a child to draw, and have meaningful symbolism. Entries were to be submitted by email or by post and be received by the commission by August 13, 2020 to be considered. The deadline was moved to August 1 to allow time for the commission to complete the selection process.

Selection of finalists 

More than 2000 submissions (other estimates put this figure at 2800 images, but a few images were erroneously repeated) meeting the legislative criteria were received and displayed on the Mississippi Department of Archives and History website. Each of the 9 commission members picked 25 flags, narrowing the list down to 147.

At an August 14 meeting, the commission announced that they had selected nine proposals. These proposals, depicting various elements including a representation of the Mississippi River, magnolias, and stars composed of diamonds significant to the Choctaw nation, had either red, white, and blue or green and white color schemes. The commission announced that they would narrow these designs down to five finalists at its next meeting on August 18. Five semifinalists were published on August 18, and this was reduced to two finalists  on August 25.

The final two flags were the "Great River Flag" designed by Micah Whitson and "The New Magnolia" designed by Rocky Vaughan, Sue Anna Joe, Kara Giles and Dominique Pugh.

On September 2, the commission voted 8–1 to put the New Magnolia flag on the November ballot. Slight modifications were made to the original design, including making the text bolder and the red and gold bars thicker. The flag is officially referred to as the "In God We Trust Flag". Rocky Vaughan is credited with designing the flag's overall layout, with design support provided by Sue Anna Joe, Kara Giles and Dominique Pugh (who created the magnolia illustration featured in the center). Micah Whitson was also given credit for the appearance of the Native American star.

The referendum passed by a 73% to 27% margin on November 3, 2020. It was then approved by the Mississippi State House of Representatives on January 5, 2021 and passed by the State Senate on January 6, 2021. It was then signed into law by Governor Reeves on January 11, 2021, making the "In God We Trust Flag" the official state flag.

Controversy 
The Satanic Temple has threatened to sue the State of Mississippi if the controversial phrase "In God We Trust" is included on the flag. Americans United for Separation of Church and State declared the state's actions as trading "a white nationalist symbol for a Christian nationalist one". Both the American Humanist Association and Americans United for Separation of Church and State have published their own editorials in disagreement with the use of the phrase on a new flag.

"Let Mississippi Vote" is a group that is campaigning for another referendum on a choice of four flag designs including the Magnolia flag that was adopted in the November 2020 referendum and the version that it replaced. Their aim is to give Mississippians a choice instead of voting on only one flag. The group reached their goal of 5000 volunteers and have sent wording for their referendum to the Mississippi Attorney General's Office for approval. They would need the valid signatures of 106,190 Mississippi residents for the initiative to be placed on a ballot as early as 2021.

Opinion polling

Result

Result by county

Source: Mississippi Secretary of State

See also 
 2001 Mississippi flag referendum
 Modern display of the Confederate battle flag
 Removal of Confederate monuments and memorials

References 

November 2020 events in the United States
Flag controversies in the United States
Flag referendums
flag referendum
Mississippi flag referendum
Mississippi ballot measures